Boljoo, or Boljoo Chat, is a popular freeware Mongolian script instant messaging computer program among Mongols. It is based on a simple Mongolian input-method.

Boljoo IME 
There is also a standalone Mongolian input method made by Boljoo, called Boljoo IME. Boljoo IME supports Menksoft and Saiyin codes.

Unlike Menksoft Mongolian IME, Boljoo IME has an English installation interface and is installed as English by default. However, it's a standalone program in the system tray, so you can not find it in ctfmon. And the IME must be enabled before use.

Designed for the Inner Mongolian who cannot speak Chinese, Boljoo IME has a pure Mongolian script installation and using guide.

See also 

 Comparison of cross-platform instant messaging clients
Comparison of instant messaging protocols
Comparison of Internet Relay Chat clients
Comparison of LAN messengers
Comparison of VoIP software
List of SIP software
List of video telecommunication services and product brands
 Mongolian script

References 

http://www.boljoo.com/index.php?m=content&c=index&a=show&catid=2&id=10

External links
 Boljoo 
 Boljoo IME, written in Mongolian script

Instant messaging clients
Mongolian-language computing
Inner Mongolia